Primuline is a dye containing the benzothiazole ring system. Primuline itself is also known as Direct yellow 7, Carnotine, or C.I. 49010.

The primulines are considered derivatives of dehydrothiotoluidine (aminobenzenyltoluylmercaptan), which is obtained when para-toluidine is heated with sulfur for eighteen hours at 180–190 °C and then for a further six hours at 200–220 °C
Dehydrothiotoluidine is not itself a dye-stuff, but if the heating is carried out at a higher temperature in the presence of more sulfur, then a base is formed, which gives primuline yellow upon sulfonation.

Primuline yellow is a mixture of sodium salts and probably contains at least three thiazole rings in combination. It is a substantive cotton dye of rather fugitive shade, but can be diazotized on the fibre and then developed with other components, yielding a series of ingrain colors.

Primuline is usually available as a sodium salt. Primuline is fluorescent.

Thioflavin T is obtained by the methylation of dehydrothiotoluidine with methanol in the presence of hydrochloric acid. Thioflavin S results from the methylation of dehydrothiotoluidine with sulfonic acid. This sulfonic acid on oxidation with bleaching powder or with lead peroxide, in alkaline solution yields chloramine yellow, which dyes cotton a beautiful yellow.

References

Anilines
Benzothiazoles
Sulfonic acids
Thiazole dyes